Joseph Rozier was bishop of Poitiers from 1975 to 1994. Near the end of his episcopate he published a statement in the Nouvelle République du Centre-Ouest outlining incompatibility between National Front membership and acceptance as a Christian catechumen.
He died in 1994.

References

Bishops of Poitiers
1994 deaths
Year of birth missing